Tromantadine is an antiviral medicine used to treat herpes simplex virus. It is available in a topical gel under trade names Viru-Merz and Viru-Merz Serol. Its performance is similar to aciclovir.

Like rimantadine, amantadine, and adapromine, tromantadine is a derivative of adamantane.

Mechanism
Tromantadine inhibits the early and late events in the virus replication cycle. It changes the glycoproteins of the host cells, therefore impeding the absorption of the virus. It inhibits penetration of the virus. It also prevents uncoating of the virions.

Synthesis

Amide formation between amantadine and chloroacetyl chloride gives N-Adamantan-1-yl-2-chloro-acetamide [5689-59-8] (1). Ether formation with Deanol (2) then completes the synthesis of tromantadine (3).

References

External links
 Viru-Merz website

Anti-herpes virus drugs
Adamantanes
Acetamides
Dimethylamino compounds